SS City of Venice was an intermediate ocean liner that was launched in 1924 in Northern Ireland for Ellerman Lines. In the Second World War she was a troop ship. In 1943 a U-boat sank her in the Mediterranean, killing 22 of the crew and troops aboard.

She was one of at least three successive ships of the Ellermans Lines to be called City of Venice. There was a sailing ship that was built in 1867 and wrecked in 1871, and a steamship that was built in 1875 and scrapped in 1912.

Details
Workman, Clark and Company built City of Venice in Belfast, launching her on 6 February 1924 and completing her that April. As built, she had a quadruple-expansion steam engine that was rated at 819 NHP.

In 1933 Ellerman Lines had a steam turbine with electric transmission added. Exhaust steam from the low-pressure cylinder of her piston engine drove the turbine. The turbine drove an electric generator, which powered an electric motor that drove the same shaft as her piston engine.

The addition of the turbine increased City of Venices fuel efficiency.

City of Venice was equipped with wireless direction finding from about 1933 and an echo sounding device from about 1934.

Wartime service
In the Second World War City of Venice carried troops and supplies between the UK, Africa, India and Egypt. In 1941 she paid one visit to Halifax, Nova Scotia, from where she sailed to Liverpool in Convoy HX 146. She sailed mostly unescorted, with only occasional convoy protection. After the Allied invasion of French North Africa she sailed between the Clyde and the Mediterranean, starting with Convoy KMS 3G that left the Clyde on 8 November and reached Philippeville in French Algeria on 26 November.

Loss
Her final voyage was in support of Operation Husky, the Allied invasion of Sicily. City of Venice was carrying 292 infantry of the 1st Canadian Division, ten naval personnel, and 700 tons of military equipment including the landing craft HMS LCE-14. She was in Convoy KMS 18B, which left the Clyde on 24 June 1943.

The torpedo blew a hole in her number two hold and destroyed one of her lifeboats. In the hold were military vehicles whose fuel caught fire, and the explosion disabled the ship's auxiliary pump and deck water service pipes. Water started to get into number three hold as well, and the ship started to settle by the head.

City of Venices Master, James Wyper, gave the order to abandon ship with six of the lifeboats, keeping back boat number eight alongside the ship for himself and a skeleton crew. Boat number six was launched too quickly and swamped, and as a result two lascar crewmen drowned. 19 rafts and two floats were also launched, and by 2130 hrs everyone had left the ship except the skeleton crew of 25–30 men. They fought the fire with the hope of controlling it and then beaching the ship on the coast.

Rescue

At about 2200 hrs boat number eight went to rescue survivors in the water. The fire now threatened to ignite the ship's forward magazine and some petrol that she was carrying as deck cargo, so the   came alongside the ship and took off the remainder of the skeleton crew.

Boat number eight, carrying about 60 people, then came alongside Teviots starboard quarter, but became fouled, capsized and threw all its occupants into the sea. Captain Wyper, eight crew, one DEMS gunner, nine Canadian troops and their commanding officer were killed.

Teviot rescued 204 of the survivors. The   and rescue tug Restive rescued the remainder. The survivors were landed at Algiers on 5 July. City of Venice sank at 0530 hrs that morning, burning fore and aft.

Until relatively recently  was widely believed to have sunk City of Venice. Newer research shows this is inconsistent with the time of the sinking, and U-409 must have been responsible. U-409 was sunk a week later, with the loss of 11 of her 48 crew.

References

1924 ships
Maritime incidents in July 1943
Ocean liners of the United Kingdom
Ships built in Belfast
Ships of the Ellerman Lines
Ships sunk by German submarines in World War II
Steamships of the United Kingdom
Troop ships of the United Kingdom
World War II passenger ships of the United Kingdom
World War II shipwrecks in the Mediterranean Sea